Joseph Elkington (baptised 1 January 1740 at Stretton-on-Dunsmore in Warwickshire, died October 1806) was an English agriculturalist, lauded by parliament for his reforms to land drainage.

Career 

While farming at Princethorpe, Warwickshire he devised a way of using boreholes to drain boggy land. For this innovation, and concerned that his frail health would result in the loss of his knowledge before it was shared, parliament awarded him, in 1795, £1,000 and a gold ring. Edinburgh land surveyor John Johnstone (d. 1838) was employed by the Board of Agriculture to study Elkington's methods.

Elkington subsequently worked in partnership with Lancelot "Capability" Brown to develop drainage plans for the latter's landscaping schemes, starting with one at Fisherwick Park near Lichfield.

Elkington moved to Hey House in Staffordshire in 1797 to farm  of land at Madeley, which became known as Bog Farm.

Personal life 

Elkington was the eldest son of Joseph Elkington (1697–1758), a yeoman farmer, and Mary, née Gallimore (died 1750). He had epilepsy. He married Sarah Webb (baptised 1738, died 1821), daughter of Richard and Mary, on 26 December 1760. Nine of their children survived Elkington. His grandson was the industrialist George Elkington. He died at Hay House on 17 October 1806 and was buried in the churchyard at All Saints' Church, Madeley on 20 October. A monument to him in All Saints' churchyard, Stretton-on-Dunsmore, calls him a "pioneer of land drainage".

Further reading

References

External links 
 Stretton-on-Dunsmore History Society page with pictures of the memorial
 Elkington family history page with picture of the ring

1806 deaths
People from Warwickshire (before 1974)
People from Madeley, Staffordshire
English civil engineers
18th-century English farmers
Year of birth unknown
People with epilepsy
1740 births
19th-century English farmers